Marte Monsen (born 27 January 2000) is a Norwegian alpine skier.

Career
She competed at the 2017, 2018 and 2019 World Junior Alpine Skiing Championships, and of the twelve events in total, her best outing was the 2018 giant slalom event where she finished fifth.

She made her FIS Alpine Ski World Cup debut in December 2018 in Courchevel, but was disqualified, and failed to finish her next race as well as the 2019–2020 season opener in Sölden. She collected her first World Cup points with a 26th place in the giant slalom in January 2020 in Sestriere.

She represents the sports club Aron SK. She is a younger sister of Marcus Monsen.

Europa Cup results
Monsen has won an overall Europa Cup and one specialty standings.

FIS Alpine Ski Europa Cup
Overall: 2021
Giant slalom: 2021

References

External links
 

2000 births
Living people
Sportspeople from Drammen
Norwegian female alpine skiers